Evans Soligo (born 14 January 1979) is a retired Italian footballer who played his entire career for clubs in Italy's Serie B and Lega Pro.

Career
Born in Marghera, the inland part of Venice, Soligo started his career at hometown club A.C. Venezia. Since 1998–99 season he was loaned to Serie C1 and Serie C2 clubs Sandonà, SPAL and Lumezzane, which also located in northern Italy. After Venezia owner Maurizio Zamparini took over Palermo from by–then A.S. Roma President Franco Sensi in July, Zamparini bought most of the player of Venezia to Palermo in August and planned to sell Venezia to uncredited person (AC Venezia then fold in 2005). Players namely Stefano Morrone, Daniel Andersson, Bilica, Igor Budan, Francesco Ciullo, Kewullay Conteh, Arturo Di Napoli, Valentino Lai, Filippo Maniero, Antonio Marasco, Francesco Modesto, Frank Ongfiang, Generoso Rossi, Mario Santana, Ighli Vannucchi and William Viali all left for the Sicily side. But at the start of season he was loaned back to Venezia from Palermo along with Budan and Andrea Guerra. Soligo made his Serie B debut with Venezia, on 19 October 2002 (round 8 but the 6th match as first two postponed) He was in the starting XI and replaced by Anderson in 77th minute, 1 minute after Daniele Amerini scored the equalizing goal. The match eventually ended in 1–1 with Ternana. Soligo then remained in starting XI until round 21 (31 January), which he appeared as sub. He played his next match on round 35 and played all last 4 matches as one of the starting XI (round 35 to 38).

In 2003–04 season Soligo returned to Palermo but just made 9 league appearances for the Serie B champion.

Soligo was not in Palermo's Serie A plan, on 21 July 2004, he was loaned back to Serie B for Triestina, 3 days before the pre–season camp. On 31 January 2005 he was loaned to fellow Serie B team Verona which aimed to promotion. But he just made 11 league appearances and the team missed the chance to enter the promotion playoffs by finished 1 point less than Ascoli, which Ascoli eventually promoted to Serie A due to Caso Genoa and bankrupt of Torino Calcio (and a new club Torino F.C. re–admitted to Serie B). That season also saw the bankrupt of Salernitana Sport and Salernitana Calcio 1919 re–admitted to Serie C1, which Soligo left for the re–found Salerno club.

With the southern Italy side for 5 seasons, he won Serie C1 Group B champion with the team in 2008 and spent the last 2 seasons at Serie B. The team avoided relegated in 2009 by finished 1 point more than Cittadella and Rimini, which the latter relegated after losing the playoffs. But after the team relegated again to Lega Pro Prima Divisione (ex–Serie C1 and later expelled), he joined Serie B side Vicenza on free transfer, returned to Veneto region after 5 years at Campania.

In summer 2012 he moved to Paganese; in november 2013 accords with the Delta Rovigo. After the signing season for the San Marino; summer of 2015 plays in Venezia.

Honours
Palermo
Serie B: 2004

Salernitana
Serie C1: 2008

References

External links
 Profile at La Gazzetta dello Sport (2009–10) 
 Profile at Lega–Calcio.it 
 Profile at Football.it 
 
 Profile at Palermo (2003–04)  

Italian footballers
Serie B players
Serie C players
Serie D players
Venezia F.C. players
S.P.A.L. players
F.C. Lumezzane V.G.Z. A.S.D. players
Palermo F.C. players
U.S. Triestina Calcio 1918 players
Hellas Verona F.C. players
U.S. Salernitana 1919 players
L.R. Vicenza players
Paganese Calcio 1926 players
Association football midfielders
Footballers from Venice
1979 births
Living people